The Patrol is a 2013 British action drama film set in Helmand Province, Afghanistan in 2006.  It looks at the Afghan conflict through the eyes of British soldiers. It won Film of the Festival (Feature)  at Raindance Film Festival 2013.

Cast
 Owain Arthur as Taff 
 Nicholas Beveney as Sergeant 'Sol' Campbell 
 Daniel Fraser as Lieutenant Jonathan Bradshaw 
 Alex McNally as Ginge 
 Oliver Mott as Stab 
 Ben Righton as Captain William Richardson 
 Nav Sidhu as Smudge

Release
The Patrol was released by Soda Pictures on 7 February 2014 in the United Kingdom and on 26 May 2014 by Epic Pictures Group in the United States.

Reception
Peter Bradshaw of The Guardian gave it four out of five stars, praising the film's director, "writer-director Tom Petch makes a powerful impression with this tough, smart war movie on a shrewdly managed small scale, about a British army patrol in Afghanistan."

Awards
 Winner Film of the Festival (Feature) Raindance Film Festival 2013.
 Nominated British Independent Film Awards 2013.

References

External links
 
 
 

2013 films
British action drama films
Films set in Afghanistan
Films shot in Morocco
War in Afghanistan (2001–2021) films
2010s English-language films
2010s British films